Porn in the Hood is a 2012 French sex comedy film written and directed by Franck Gastambide, based on the web series Kaira Shopping. It was the highest-grossing French film of 2012.

Plot
The film follows the misadventures of three young men, Mousten, Abdelkrim and Momo, who have been friends since childhood and never left their hometown, Melun. Unemployed, without ambition or a purpose in life, they spend part of their time watching porn films and eventually become convinced that entering the porn industry could make them rich and famous. They meet a sleazy producer, who asks them to provide a video demonstration. Embarking on a quest to find a girl for their video, the three friends must face a series of humiliating mishaps.

Cast
 Medi Sadoun as Abdelkrim
 Franck Gastambide as Mousten
 Jib as Momo
 Ramzy as Warner
 Alice Belaïdi as Kadija
 Pom Klementieff as Tia
 Demon One as Steeve
 Ismaël Sy Savané as Ismaël
 Annabelle Lengronne as Stay
 Sissi Duparc as Sylvaine
 François Damiens as Claude Fachoune
 Doudou Masta as organizer of rap festival
 François Bureloup as Bernard
 Alex Lutz as The Egyptian
 Katsuni as herself
 Armelle as Libertine orgy's organizer
 Eric Cantona as coach of the football team
 Elie Semoun as himself
 François Levantal as sex-shop owner
 Cut Killer as hip-hop festival DJ
 Mister You as himself
 Rocco Siffredi as himself
 Sir Samuel as the Boss
 Bridgette B as the American
 Mafia K'1 fry as themselves

References

External links
 

2012 films
2012 comedy films
2010s French-language films
2010s sex comedy films
Films about pornography
Films based on web series
Films directed by Franck Gastambide
Films set in France
French sex comedy films
Gaumont Film Company films
2010s French films